Cynthia Phua Siok Gek (born 19 August 1958) is a Singaporean business executive and former politician. She was a Member of Parliament of Aljunied GRC for the Paya Lebar Ward from 25 October 2001 to 19 April 2011.

Career 
Phua was the general manager of NTUC Fairprice Co-operative's real estate business unit and the managing director of estate management company SLF Management Services. She had also served as Chief Executive Officer of Bishan–Toa Payoh Town Council and Chairman of Aljunied Town Council.

She was a Member of Parliament of Aljunied GRC (Paya Lebar Ward) who represented the People's Action Party (PAP) from 25 October 2001 to 19 April 2011. 

In the 2011 general elections, she was part of a team of five candidates, led by Foreign Affairs Minister George Yeo, which contested the same GRC again. Their team lost the elections to the Workers' Party (WP) team led by Low Thia Khiang. It was the first time a group representation constituency has been lost to an opposition party since the GRC system was introduced in 1988. Of the 143,148 registered voters in Aljunied GRC, 72,165(54.7%) voted for the WP while 59,732(45.3%) chose the PAP.

Phua retired from politics after her electoral loss. She joined real estate consultancy Knight Frank Singapore in 2013 as its executive director of retail services. Phua was appointed as a director of Viking Offshore And Marine in 2015.

References

External links
 Singapore Parliament CVs of MPs
 PAP supporters try to clarify incident involving Cynthia Phua
 TOC breaking news: Aljunied GRC Facebook site alleges defamation? 
 Cynthia Phua's treatment of constituents
 Aljunied swing vote

1958 births
Living people
Singaporean people of Teochew descent
Members of the Parliament of Singapore
People's Action Party politicians
National University of Singapore alumni
Catholic Junior College alumni
Singaporean women in politics